Goodenia peacockiana is a species of flowering plant in the family Goodeniaceae and is endemic to semi-arid areas of inland Western Australia. It is a prostrate to low-lying annual herb with elliptic to lance-shaped leaves with toothed or lobed edges, and racemes of yellow flowers, often with darker markings.

Description

Taxonomy and naming
Goodenia peacockiana was first formally described in 1980 by Roger Charles Carolin in the journal Telopea from material he collected on the road between Yelma and Leonora in 1967. The specific epithet (peacockiana) William James Peacock (born 1937), a friend of Carolin who was a molecular biologist at the CSIRO.

Distribution and habitat
This goodenia grows on sandplains in semi-arid inland areas of Western Australia.

Conservation status
Goodenia peacockiana is classified as "not threatened" by the Government of Western Australia Department of Parks and Wildlife.

References

peacockiana
Eudicots of Western Australia
Plants described in 1980
Taxa named by Roger Charles Carolin
Endemic flora of Australia